Riverview is a historic house in Clarksville, Tennessee. It was built in 1830, and it became a writer's retreat for Allen Tate in the 1930s. It is listed on the National Register of Historic Places.

History
The house was built in 1830.

In 1930, the house was purchased by Ben Tate, Allen Tate's brother. Tate was a graduate of Vanderbilt University, English professor and a poet. He wrote Ode to the Confederate Dead in the house. His wife, née Caroline Gordon, wrote the novel Children of Innocence, in the house. Literary guests included Donald Davidson, Malcolm Cowley and William Faulkner.

The house has been listed on the National Register of Historic Places since March 26, 1979.

References

Houses on the National Register of Historic Places in Tennessee
National Register of Historic Places in Montgomery County, Tennessee
Houses completed in 1830